Michael Everett Otto (born July 24, 1983) is a former American football offensive tackle. He was drafted by the Titans in the seventh round of the 2007 NFL Draft. He played college football at Purdue.

Early years
Otto attended Maconaquah High School, located in Bunker Hill, Indiana where he played basketball, track, and football.

Otto committed to Purdue University on July 8, 2003. Otto had no other FBS scholarship offers for football.

Professional career

Tennessee Titans
Otto was drafted by the Tennessee Titans in the seventh round of the 2007 NFL Draft. He spent the 2007 season on the team's practice squad, and was promoted to the active roster for a playoff game against San Diego on January 6. He played in only one game in 2008, the season-finale against the Indianapolis Colts on December 28. He played in 14 games for the Titans in 2009, mainly on special teams, and was re-signed on February 17, 2010.

References

External links
Tennessee Titans bio
Purdue Boilermakers football bio

1983 births
Living people
American football offensive tackles
Players of American football from Indiana
Sportspeople from Kokomo, Indiana
Purdue Boilermakers football players
Tennessee Titans players